The flag of Aosta Valley is one of the official symbols of the region of Aosta Valley, Italy. The current flag was adopted on 16 March 2006.

History 

The flag was created in 1942 from an idea by canon Joseph Bréan, who proposed its use in an anti-fascist brochure from 1942 entitled "The Great Aosta Valley". Father Bréan drew the colours of the 16th-century coat of arms of the Duchy of Aosta, a silver lion on a black shield with a red tongue, and a two-colour flag. Shortly thereafter, the resistance movements in the Valle d'Aosta made them their own, creating a halved vertically flag which, after its liberation, did not obtain any formal ratification, both because of widespread fear that it might fuel desires for independence and because of its similarity to some banners of the anarchist movement.

The flag was in unofficial use from 1947 until it was adopted as official with the Regional Law of 2006.

References

Aosta Valley
Aosta Valley
Flags introduced in 2006